Robert Harold Stewart (November 10, 1950 – February 3, 2017) was a Canadian professional ice hockey defenceman who played nine seasons in the National Hockey League for the Boston Bruins, California Golden Seals, Cleveland Barons, St. Louis Blues and Pittsburgh Penguins.

Playing career
Stewart was drafted in the first round, 13th overall by the Boston Bruins in the 1970 NHL Entry Draft.

Playing most of his career for cellar dwelling teams, his career plus-minus rating of minus 257 is the lowest total in NHL history among players for whom the stat has been recorded.

While with the Cleveland Barons, the team missed payroll in 1977. The Washington Post interviewed Stewart about the problems that caused.

Career statistics

References

External links

1950 births
2017 deaths
Boston Bruins draft picks
Boston Bruins players
California Golden Seals players
Canadian ice hockey defencemen
Canadian people of Scottish descent
Cleveland Barons (NHL) players
Ice hockey people from Prince Edward Island
National Hockey League first-round draft picks
Oakland Seals players
Oshawa Generals players
Pittsburgh Penguins players
St. Louis Blues players
Sportspeople from Charlottetown